Sir Francis Douglas Blake, 1st Baronet, CB, DL (27 February 1856 – 5 February 1940) was Deputy Lieutenant of Northumberland, Vice Lord Lieutenant in 1920 and 1931, a Justice of the Peace, and a Member of Parliament.

The son of Francis Blake (1832–1861), the heir of Sir Francis Blake of Twizell Castle, on the death of his father he inherited substantial estates in Northumberland including Tillmouth House, Twizell Castle and Seghill.

He was educated at University College, Oxford, and was admitted to the Inner Temple as a Barrister-at-Law. He was created a Baronet, of Tillmouth Park, in the Baronetage of the United Kingdom on 22 July 1907.

He became chairman of the Northumberland Quarter Sessions.

Later he was elected Liberal Member of Parliament for Berwick on Tweed 1916–1922, and was appointed Companion of the Order of the Bath in 1919.

He was appointed Lieutenant-Colonel commanding  of the Northumberland Royal Garrison Artillery (Militia) on 30 November 1901. That unit was disbanded in 1909. On 13 May 1925 he was appointed Honorary Colonel of the Tynemouth Heavy Brigade, Royal Artillery

He was sometime chairman of the Northumberland County Council.

Blake demolished the family house at Tillmouth and replaced it with a grand mansion in 1882 using in the process large quantities of masonry from the unfinished and abandoned project that was Twizell Castle.

He married on 14 December 1886, Selina Colquhoun, daughter of James Cleland Burns of Glenlee, Hamilton, South Lanarkshire, and was succeeded in the Baronetcy by their son Francis.

References

 Mosley, Charles, editor, Burke's Peerage & Baronetage, 106th edition, Crans, Switzerland, 1999, p. 285,

External links 

1856 births
1940 deaths
English barristers
Liberal Party (UK) MPs for English constituencies
UK MPs 1910–1918
UK MPs 1918–1922
Deputy Lieutenants of Northumberland
Companions of the Order of the Bath
Alumni of University College, Oxford
Baronets in the Baronetage of the United Kingdom
English justices of the peace
Members of the Inner Temple
Liberal Party (UK) councillors